Margaret Chilla Bulbeck (born 1951) was the emeritus professor of women's studies at Adelaide University from 1997 until 2008, and has published widely on issues of gender and difference.

Education 
Bulbeck gained a degree in economics from the University of Adelaide (1972), a master of arts (1975) and a Ph.D. in Sociology (1980) from the Australian National University, and an LL.B. from the University of Queensland (1991).

Political career 
After retiring from academic life, Bulbeck entered politics as a full-time volunteer for The Greens (WA), becoming their Secretary and co-editor of their newsletter. She also ran, unsuccessfully in the 2013 Western Australian state election for the district of Mandurah.

Bibliography

Books 
 
 
 
 
 
 
 
 
Featured in the International Feminist Journal of Politics "rethinking the canon" series: 
Extracted in

Chapters in books

Journal articles 
  
  
  
  
  
  
  
  Pdf.
  
  
 
  
  
 
  Pdf.

Papers 
  Occasional paper no. 5.
  Working paper no. 35.
 
 
 
 
  Pdf.

References

External links 
 Profile page: Chilla Bulbeck, University of Adelaide

1951 births
Australian Greens candidates
Australian National University alumni
Australian women academics
Gender studies academics
Living people
Place of birth missing (living people)
University of Adelaide alumni
Academic staff of the University of Adelaide
University of Queensland alumni